The Battle of Tabqa, part of the Raqqa campaign (2016–17) of the Rojava-Islamist conflict, resulted from a Syrian Democratic Forces (SDF) operation against the Islamic State of Iraq and the Levant (ISIL) to recapture and secure the Tabqa Dam, al-Thawrah (al-Tabqah), Tabqa Airbase, and the surrounding countryside. The SDF was supported by the United States military. The assault on these targets by the anti-ISIL forces began on 22 March 2017, and control of Tabqa and the Tabqa Dam was achieved by these forces on 10 May 2017.

Background 

The SDF, moving to take Raqqa, positioned themselves around the city as part of the second phase of the operation. However, as part of this, they encountered IS forces dug in around the Tabqa Dam, west of Raqqa city. Because of the dam's fragility and strategic importance, the SDF could not immediately move on the dam, and there were concerns it could break and cause flooding. ISIL had threatened to open the floodgates if the dam was attacked, which would destroy many villages downstream.

Initial assault 
In late January 2017, it was reported that a number of ISIL militants were hiding inside the structure of Tabqa Dam, with senior militant leaders who used to be "very important prisoners" wanted by the US and several other countries, in order to deter a possible US-led coalition strike on these targets.

Probing attacks took place in January 2017, when U.S. special forces crossed the Euphrates in amphibious raids, including the raid against ISIL by combined SDF and U.S. special forces on the Tabqa Dam and the nearby city of al-Thawrah (al-Tabqah). Following the raids, ISIL counterattacked the SDF positions, but the counterattacks were largely repelled.

The offensive

Assault on Tabqa Dam and Tabqa Airbase 

On 22 March, the SDF began an assault to capture the Tabqa Dam, al-Thawrah (al-Tabqah; Tabqa) city, and the Tabqa Airbase. Five hundred SDF fighters and additional US soldiers of the CJTF–OIR were airlifted by  V-22 Osprey helicopters of the United States military across the Euphrates river and Lake Assad and were dropped on the Shurfa Peninsula to the west of Tabqa city. The attack was supported by artillery support from United States Marines, as well as air support. SDF and US forces also landed on the Jazirat al-'Ayd Island (or Peninsula) to the west of Tabqa Dam, capturing it as well. An anti-ISIL coalition spokesman announced that the advance had cut off the highway linking the Aleppo, Deir ez-Zor, and Raqqa Governorates. He added that around 75-80% of the attacking force consisted of Arab fighters, with the rest being Kurds. The SDF stated that the advance was also meant to block any advance on Raqqa by the Syrian Arab Army from the west.

The operation was described by Pentagon spokesman Eric Pahon as a large high-priority offensive to secure the area both around Tabqa and the associated Tabqa Dam. The airlift of forces behind enemy lines enabled SDF and US forces to cut the road to Raqqa from the west. Four towns were also seized as part of the amphibious landing. According to the US, 80% of the fighters in the airlift were Arabs, and the rest were Kurds in the YPG and the YPJ.

Coalition press announced that the assault would be a complex operation involving Kurdish troops and the SDF, in both air and amphibious attacks. It was believed that the dam and general area were held by hundreds of ISIL fighters, many of them foreign fighters.

On 24 March, SDF spokeswoman Jihan Sheikh Ahmed announced that they had reached the Tabqa Dam, and were fighting ISIL at its entrance. The assault on the dam was spearheaded by SDF fighters who were backed by United States Special Operation Forces. It was also reported that the SDF had captured eight villages to the southwest of Tabqa city. Amaq meanwhile claimed the SDF had withdrawn from the dam. Jabhat Thuwar al-Raqqa claimed online that the SDF had captured the Tabqa Airbase; however, Al-Masdar News stated that the SDF's open room had stated that the claim was completely fabricated.

On 26 March, the SDF captured two villages to the east of Tabqa. It was also reported that ISIL was shelling the surroundings of Tabqa Dam with heavy weaponry. On the same day, ISIL claimed that Tabqa Dam was on the verge of collapse and that all the floodgates were closed. The dam was reported to have become inoperable, which ISIL claimed was due to Coalition bombing and artillery strikes, though the SOHR stated that the actual reasons were unknown, adding that ISIL still held its main building and turbines. That day, U.S. aircraft had dropped three 2,000 pound bombs against the towers attached to the dam, causing critical equipment to fail and the dam to stop functioning. One of the bombs failed to detonate. The dam almost failed as the floodgates were rendered inoperable, but an emergency ceasefire coordinated between the Islamic State, Syrian government, and the United States let engineers make emergency repairs before the dam collapsed, which could have potentially killed thousands of civilians.

The SDF however denied that it had been hit, while RISBS (Raqqa is Silently Being Slaughtered) stated that ISIL was informing fleeing civilians that the dam was safe. Additionally, the US-led Coalition stated that the Tabqa Dam was structurally sound, and that the dam had not been targeted by any airstrikes. They also stated that the SDF controlled an emergency spillway at the northern part of the dam, which could be used in the event of an emergency. On the same day, SDF spokesman Talal Silo announced that the SDF had stormed the Tabqa military airport, and had taken sixty to seventy percent of it. They later announced that they had completely captured the Al-Tabqa Airbase, following a 24-hour battle. ISIL fighters stationed at Tabqa Airbase were reported to have withdrawn northward, to Tabqa city. Additionally, SDF forces captured two villages near the airbase during the advance.

ISIL was reported to have reversed an earlier evacuation order in Raqqa, stating that the dam was safe and ordered civilians to remain in the city. A day later however the SDF announced they were temporarily pausing their offensive for the dam. Later in the day, a spokeswoman of the SDF announced that engineers who had been permitted to check the dam and its operations did not find it was damaged or malfunctioning. On 28 March, ISIL deployed an additional 900 fighters to the Tabqa District, in an attempt to stop the SDF advances.

Besieging Tabqa city 

On 29 March, the SDF cut the road between al-Thawrah (al-Tabqah) city and Raqqa. The SDF stated that ISIL had shelled the Tabqa Dam during the day, causing repair work to be temporarily paused. On 31 March, SDF forces attacked the town of Al-Safsafah, to the east of Tabqa, nearly besieging the city.

The SDF and some activists stated on 2 April that it had repelled a major ISIL counterattack to the northeast of Tabqa city, near the Tabqa Dam, and near the Tabqa airbase. They also continued to advance in villages to the east of Tabqa city. On the same day, it was reported that the SDF had completely besieged al-Thawrah (al-Tabqah) city, with Kurdish activists stating that two SDF units linked up to the east of the city. SOHR, however, stated that they were still trying to besiege the city. SDF fighters continued battling for Safsafah and Ibad, on the next day, to fully encircle Tabqa. On 3 April, it was reported that ISIL was possibly in the process of moving its capital from Raqqa city to Mayadin, in the Deir ez-Zor Governorate. This followed months of gradual relocation of resources and senior ISIL leaders from Raqqa to Mayadin. The SDF entered and besieged Safsafah on 5 April, thus also besieging Tabqa city while claiming that it had also taken control of a major part of Safsafah. The village was captured by the next day, resulting in the SDF completely encircling Tabqa city.

The SDF captured Ibad village, to the east of Safsafah, on 9 April, further expanding their control in eastern countryside of Tabqa, while more than 25 ISIL fighters were killed in the clashes. ISIL also launched unsuccessful counterattacks on Safsafah, while also attacking Al-Tabqa Airbase. The SDF captured another village near Tabqa on the next day.

On 11 April, the US-led Coalition reported that the SDF had captured 60% of Tabqa Dam, and that they were "very close" to liberating the dam. On 13 April, the United States military stated that CJTF-OIR had bombed an SDF fighting position near Tabqa as it was misidentified as belonging to ISIL. It added that the airstrikes resulted in deaths of 18 SDF fighters.

Battle for Tabqa city 
On 15 April, the SDF advanced within "hundreds of metres" from Tabqa, and fighting reached two suburbs of the city. Later on the same day, the SDF entered al-Thawrah (al-Tabqah) from the east and the west, capturing the entire Alexandria suburb in southern Tabqa, bringing 15% of the city under SDF control. On 17 April, the SDF advanced further, bringing 20% of Tabqa city under their control. Also on 17 April 2017, it was announced that 200 fighters from the Manbij Military Council would participate in this part of the battle, with a total of 350. On 18 April, the SDF captured the ISIL radio station in the city. In the following days, the SDF decided to accelerate their operations in Tabqa and by 22 April managed to secure a quarter of the city.

The SDF advanced in Tabqa city again on 30 April. It stated that it had captured six more districts and ISIL only controlled the northern part of the town near Tabqa dam. SOHR stated that the SDF controlled at least 40% of the city, including more than half of the Old City area. Later on the same day, it was reported that the SDF had captured at least 60% of the city. On the next day the SDF stated that it had completely captured the Old City area, leaving ISIL in control of only the newer areas of the town alongside the dam. SOHR stated that they controlled about 80% of the city.

On 2 May, the SDF stated that it had captured about 90 percent of the town amid reports of negotiations between Kurdish fighters and ISIL to allow the latter to withdraw from the remaining areas under its control. By 3 May, the SDF had almost captured the whole city except in a small northern area and district near the dam. ISIL also carried out counterattacks in and near Tabqa. It was later reported that a deal had been reached to allow remaining ISIL fighters to withdraw from the city as well as the dam. The SDF and its commanders however denied any deal had been reached, adding that clashes were still ongoing against ISIL in a village near Tabqa and the three northern districts of the town including some militants who were hiding among civilians.

End of the battle 
By 10 May, there were still two ISIL holdouts in the Tabqa area. On one side, 14 Chechen and French African ISIL fighters, members of the elite Ingimassayeen units, still held the control room, the floodgates, and a number of tunnels inside Tabqa Dam. Even though they were left without light or fresh air, as the SDF had shut down all electricity to the dam, and without means to communicate with their allies because the coalition jammed their radio frequencies, these ISIL fighters had resisted attempts to clear them out for weeks. The second, bigger holdout was in northern Tabqa city, where around 50 ISIL militants still defended a number of highly fortified apartments. In course of 10 May, however, this last resistance was finally broken, when the remaining ISIL defenders surrendered or fled. According to the United States Central Command, the Islamists had acceded to the SDF's demand of dismantling the IEDs surrounding the dam. The anti-ISIL coalition stated that it tracked those militants who fled and targeted those who could be killed without harming civilians. At 16:00 on that day, SDF commander Rojda Felat stated that the Tabqa Dam had been completely brought under control of the SDF. The SDF conducted clearance operations after the capture and hunted for any remaining ISIL holdouts in addition to carrying out de-mining operations. After the battle, thousands of the local Arab population joined the SDF.

See also 

 Battle for Mosul Dam
 Battle of Al-Tabqa airbase
 Battle of Raqqa (2017)
 Manbij offensive
 Tishrin Dam offensive

References 

Tabqa
Tabqa
Tabqa
Tabqa
Tabqa
Tabqa
Raqqa Governorate in the Syrian civil war